Beechholme was a children's home in Fir Tree Road, Banstead, Surrey. It was founded in 1879 as a Residential School for poor children from the slums of Kensington and Chelsea and run under a Village system.

A self-contained community, the home consisted of twenty four, large, detached houses on both sides of a long, tree-lined avenue. The houses were named after tree and shrubs - such as  Beech, Oak, Cedar, Acacia and the like - each one run as a ‘family’ unit, autonomously managed and quite independent of its neighbours. Each house was managed by 'house parents'. Within the grounds, there were administration buildings, a nursery school, primary school, sewing rooms (complete with seamstress and assistant), a cobblers shop, a full-time team of gardeners, a chapel and playing fields, etc. 
The regime was tough, but not altogether unlike that of paying residential schools of the time. Later, children came from other parts of London and the London County Council took over responsibility, followed by Wandsworth Borough Council. In 1974, the children's home was closed and the property sold.  All buildings were demolished and the site re-developed in 1975 as the High Beeches Estate. The Beech Holme Pavilion was built on the old site, and now is the location of the Beeches Montessori Nursery and local children's football clubs.

The London Metropolitan Archives hold records of the children who resided at the school. Former residents of the home include the television presenter Dilly Braimoh, who produced a television programme on Beechholme and its former residents.

External links
 Banstead History website
 Peter Eliot tribute website
 The Workhouse website

1879 establishments in England
1974 disestablishments in England
Adoption, fostering, orphan care and displacement
Defunct schools in Surrey
Educational institutions established in 1879
Educational institutions disestablished in 1974